The 1964 All-Atlantic Coast Conference football team consists of American football players chosen by various selectors for their All-Atlantic Coast Conference ("ACC") teams for the 1964 NCAA University Division football season. Selectors in 1964 included the Associated Press (AP) and the United Press International (UPI).  Players selected to the first team by both the AP and UPI are displayed below in bold.

All-Atlantic Coast Conference selections

Ends
 Ray Barlow, North Carolina State (AP-1)
 Richard Cameron, Wake Forest (AP-1)
 Chuck Drulis, Duke (AP-2)
 J. R. Wilburn, South Carolina (AP-2)

Tackles
 Glenn Sasser, North Carolina State (AP-1)
 Don Lonon, Duke (AP-1)
 Bob Kowalkowski, Virginia (AP-2)
 Olaf Drozdov, Maryland (AP-2)

Guards
 Jerry Fishman, Maryland (AP-1)
 Bennett Williams, North Carolina State (AP-1)
 Richy Zarro, North Carolina (AP-2)
 J. V. McCarthy, Duke (AP-2)

Centers
 Chris Hanburger, North Carolina (Pro Football Hall of Fame) (AP-1)
 Ted Bunton, Clemson (AP-2)

Backs
 Bob Davis, Virginia (AP-1)
 Mike Curtis, Duke (AP-1)
 Ken Willard, North Carolina (AP-1)
 Brian Piccolo, Wake Forest (AP-1)
 John Mackovic, Wake Forest (AP-2)
 Dan Reeves, South Carolina (AP-2)
 Hal Davis, Clemson (AP-2)
 Tom Hickey, Maryland (AP-2)

Key
AP = Associated Press

UPI = United Press International

See also
1964 College Football All-America Team

References

All-Atlantic Coast Conference football team
All-Atlantic Coast Conference football teams